The 1991 Milan–San Remo was the 82nd edition of the Milan–San Remo cycle race and was held on 23 March 1991. The race started in Milan and finished in San Remo. The race was won by Claudio Chiappucci of the Carrera team.

General classification

References

1991
March 1991 sports events in Europe
1991 in road cycling
1991 in Italian sport
1991 UCI Road World Cup